Dalea compacta, with the common name compact praireclover, is a plant of the Southwestern United States.

Uses
The Zuni people use the root as a poultice for sores and rashes, and an infusion of it is taken for stomach ache.

References

compacta
Flora of the Southwestern United States
Flora of New Mexico
Plants used in traditional Native American medicine